Anomala albopilosa, known by the common names green chafer, white-haired leaf chafer and sugarcane white grub, is a species of chafer beetle in the family Scarabaeidae. It was originally described in the genus Euchlora by Frederick William Hope in 1839. The beetle is native to the four major islands of Japan (Kyushu, Shikoku, Honshu and Hokkaido), the Ryukyu Islands, Korea, and Taiwan.

Taxonomy 
Anomala albopilosa contains the following subspecies:

 Anomala albopislosa subsp. albopilosa
Anomala albopilosa subsp. trachpyga
 Anomala albopilosa subsp. yashiroi
 Anomala albopilosa subsp. gracilis
 Anomala albopilosa subsp. sakishimana
 Anomala albopilosa subsp. yonaguniana

References 

Rutelinae
Beetles described in 1839
Beetles of Asia